Stadthalle may refer to:

Stadthalle (Nuremberg U-Bahn), a Nuremberg U-Bahn metro station in Fürth, Germany

Buildings

Germany
Bremerhaven Stadthalle, an arena in Bremerhaven
Stadthalle (Königsberg), a concert hall in former Königsberg
Stadthalle Bremen, an indoor arena in Bremen
Stadthalle Freiburg, a former concert hall in Freiburg im Breisgau
Stadthalle Fürth, a concert hall in Fürth
Stadthalle Köln-Mülheim, a conference centre in Cologne
Stadthalle Offenbach, a convention center in Offenbach am Main

Austria
Stadthalle (Klagenfurt), an indoor sporting arena in Klagenfurt
Stadthalle (Villach), an indoor sporting arena in Villach
Stadthalle Graz, an arrangement hall in Graz
Wiener Stadthalle, an indoor arena in Vienna

Switzerland
Sursee Stadthalle, an indoor sporting arena in Sursee